Mujer con pantalones is a Venezuelan telenovela created by Julio César Mármol and produced by Radio Caracas Television in 2004.

Marlene De Andrade and Mark Tacher starred as the protagonists with Winston Vallenilla and Alfonso Medina as co-protagonists and Eduardo Orozco as the antagonist.

Plot
María Isabel Torrealba "Micel" begins secretly working in her father's factory for two weeks, and she begins an affair with Juan José, her supervisor who doesn't know she is a Torrealba. Using a fake name, María Isabel begins investigating her older brother Vladimir who she suspects of extorting the peasants in the area. María also meets Salvador Diego Vega, her childhood friend whose father was a partner in the factory. Micel will have to navigate a world dominated by men up to the point of her willingness to sacrifice her feelings to achieve her goals so that she becomes "the woman wearing the pants".

Cast

Marlene De Andrade as María Isabel Torrealba / "Micel"
Mark Tacher as Salvador Diego Vega Andonegui
Winston Vallenilla as Juan José Rondón
Alfonso Medina as Neptalí Moreno Michel
Sheyene Gerardi as Guillermina Pérez
Daniel Alvarado as Pedro Pablo Torrealba
Julie Restifo as Cristina Galué de Torrealba
Wanda D'Isidoro as Leticia Hewson
Eduardo Orozco as Vladimir Torrealba Galué
Jalymar Salomón as Paulina Torrealba Galué
Flor Elena González as Candelaria de Lisboa
Margarita Hernández as Teresa "Teresita" Galué
Aura Rivas as María Benita Guerra
Javier Valcárcel as José Gregorio "Goyo" Lisboa
Yajaira Orta as Doña Dulia Andonegui
Mirtha Pérez as Tibaide Rondón
Estefanía López as Fernanda Rondón
Aileen Celeste as Esther Paulini
Paula Bevilacqua as Amaranta Torrealba Galué
Oscar Cabrera as Alfredito Lisboa
Cristal Avilera as Clementina
Crisbel Henríquez as Eliana Contreras
Andreína Álvarez as Linda Bombón
Marcos Campos as Evaristo Lisboa
Jeanette Flores as Camila "Camilita" Briceño
José Ángel Ávila as José María Estupiñán
César Bencid as Toribio Bertoloto
Simón Gómez as Gerardo Enrique Rondón
Andreína Mazzeo as Coromoto Olivares
Christian Chividatte as Eusebio Montiel
María Gabriela Maldonado as Daniela Romero (niña)
Carlos Arreaza as Armando López
Deyalit López as Lorena

References

External links

Venezuelan telenovelas
2004 telenovelas
RCTV telenovelas
2004 Venezuelan television series debuts
2005 Venezuelan television series endings
Spanish-language telenovelas
Television shows set in Caracas